Chung So-sung (11 February 1944 – 24 October 2020) was a writer from South Korea.

Life 
Chung So-sung was born in Bonghwa, Gyeongsangbuk-do, in 1944. He received his bachelor's and master's degrees in French literature from Seoul National University. He then received his doctorate in French literature from the University of Grenoble III in France. From 1985 until 2009 he was the French literature professor at Dankook University’s college of liberal arts. In 1977, when Chung was the French literature professor at Chonnam University’s college of education, he made his literary debut with the publication of his story “Jilju” (질주 Rush) in Hyundae Munhak. Toward the end of his study abroad in France, he published the novel Cheonnyeoneul naerineun nun (천년을 내리는 눈 The Snow of Thousand Years) in 1983. After he published Atene ganeun bae (아테네 가는 배 The Ship Bound for Athens) in early 1985, he won the Dongin Literary Award. Hwang Sun-won, who was the judge for the award, has said the following of the story: “It is a great harvest to have gotten this work, which allowed us to profoundly reaffirm the pain of our division to the world.”

Chung published 5 short story collections including Tteugeo-un gang (뜨거운 강 The Hot River), and 14 novels including Yeojaui seong (여자의 성 The Sex of Women), Daedongyeojido (대동여지도 Daedongyeojido, 5 Volumes), Taeyangin (태양인 The Sun People, 2 Volumes), Du anae (두 아내 Two Wives), and Seolhyang (설향). He strived to depict life's experiences, and he showed a style of trying to approach the meaning of life in history through characters in his works. In the same year he was awarded the Dongin Literary Award, he also won the Yun Dongju Literature Award. In recognition of his career, he was awarded the Bonghwa Artist Award in 2015 from his hometown Bonghwa.

Writing 
The novella Atene ganeun bae (아테네 가는 배 The Ship Bound for Athens), which won the 17th Dongin Literary Award, is a unique and distinguished work of fiction that is written about the historical reality of the division of Korea in the theme of the mystification and the sense of fate around pain. It compares the division of Korea to Greek mythology.

This work contains two meanings. One is related to the travels of the narrator Jongsik, and it can be said as a meaning of reality discovered within a mystical world. This is evident in the scene where the pain of division is implied through the story of the River Simois, one of the legends of Troy, and the pain crosses over from the world of myths to reality. The other is the meaning brought on by the journey of the protagonist, Juha, and this points to the fateful repetition of myths that occur again and again in reality. Juha is not able to achieve the dream of reuniting with his father, experiencing the agony of the pain in reality turning into that of the myth.

Thus, this work is showing the contrasting effects of finding the reality of pain within a myth, and discovering the repetition of the myth of pain within reality. Therefore, as the story passes through the mythical world, it turns the tale of pain within the myth into that of the real world. Also, by showing the pain within reality, it connects that into the pain within the myth.

His novel Du anae (두 아내 Two Wives, 2 Volumes), which handles the theme of the tragedy of a divided country. It depicts the scars of division through a family history. Han Cheol-wu, is a character in the book who had married in North Korea, but experienced the trauma of separation through the Korean War, and marries again in South Korea. Through this character, a somewhat familiar figure in Korean history, the author portrays a person who faces ideology. The novel is very lyrical, despite the setting of war, and it brings war into literature through its search for meaning in love and life, as well as its beautiful and unique style. Another important aspect that adds to the value of the work is that it has a fluent command of the dialects of Hamgyong-do, Pyongan-do, and Gyeongsang-do.

Particularly, this work was selected by the Literature Translation Institute of Korea, a government funded organization, as the only work to be translated into French in 1999. It was translated by Jean-Paul Desgoutte from Paris 8 University and his wife, both academics. This has led to the recognition of the work's quality.

As shown above, Chung's works show the scars of division, and the pain of separation, through love and life. However, his writing does not only concern itself with ideological matters. He has great interest in Korean history. He has published works that are inspired by Korean history, such as Daedongyeojido (대동여지도 Daedongyeojido, 5 Volumes), which depicts the story of Kim Jeong-ho, a Silhak scholar of the Joseon Dynasty, as well as Taeyangin (태양인 The Sun People, 2 Volumes), which was tells the story of Lee Jema, a scholar, a military officer, and a doctor of the late Joseon Dynasty, and the origin of Sasang typology. In fact, Taeyangin (태양인 The Sun People, 2 Volumes), a historical novel about medicine, was once officially optioned by MBC for a TV series.

Works

Short story collections 
 Atene ganeun bae (아테네 가는 배 The Ship Bound for Athens), Dongsuh Books, 1986. 
 Tteugeo-un gang (뜨거운 강 The Hot River), Dong-A Publishing, 1988.
 Ta-inui siseon (타인의 시선 The Gaze of Others), Chungrim, 1988. 
 Honhyeolui ttang (혼혈의 땅 The Land of the Mixed-Blood), Chinwu, 1990.
 Byeorange maedalin sanae (벼랑에 매달린 사내 The Man Hanging From the Cliff), Dong-A Publishing, 1991.

Novels 
 Cheonnyeoneul naerineun nun (천년을 내리는 눈 The Snow of Thousand Years), Jungumsa, 1983.   
 Akyeongui jib (악령의 집 The House of Demons), Goryeowon, 1989. 
 Yeojaui seong (여자의 성 The Sex of Women), Segye Ilbo, 1990. 
 Angae naerineun gang (안개 내리는 강 The Foggy River, 2 Volumes), Open Books, 1990. 
 Garima tan yeoin (가리마 탄 여인 The Woman With Parted Hair, 2 Volumes), Chosun Ilbo, 1991. 
 Jebikkot (제비꽃 Violet), Jayu Munhaksa, 1992.  
 Choehu-ui yeonin (최후의 연인 The Last Lover), Goryeowon, 1993.  
 Sarangui wonjoe (사랑의 원죄 The Original Sin of Love, 2 Volumes), JoongAng Ilbo, 1994.  
 Daedongyeojido (대동여지도 Daedongyeojido, 5 Volumes), Jayu Munhaksa, 1994. 
 Unmyeong (운명 Destiny), Byeokseojeong, 1996. 
 Taeyangin (태양인 The Sun People, 2 Volumes), Yolimwon, 1997. 
 Du anae (두 아내 Two Wives, 2 Volumes), Chanseom Publishing, 1999.  
 Baramui yeoin (바람의 여인 The Woman of the Wind), Silcheon Munhak, 2005.  
 Seolhyang (설향), Poem and Essay, 2012.

Works in translation 
 Les deux épouses (French)

Awards 
 17th Dongin Literary Award (1985)  
 1st Yun Dongju Literature Award (1985)  
 1st Manwu Park Young-joon Literary Prize (1988)  
 29th Woltan Literature Award (1995)  
 8th Muksa Ryu Juhyeon Literary Prize (2012)

Further reading 
 Chung, So-sung, "The Mediterranean Between Legend and Reality… Facing the Pain of the Division of the North and the South", Munhwa Ilbo, September 30, 2016.

References 

South Korean writers
1944 births
2020 deaths
People from North Gyeongsang Province
Seoul National University alumni
Academic staff of Dankook University